The following list composes the cricket clubs that make up domestic cricket in Ireland. The clubs are split into different cricket unions according to their geographic location within Ireland, these are: Leinster Cricket Union; Northern Cricket Union; Munster Cricket Union, North West Cricket Union and the newly formed Connacht Cricket Union, which was formed in November 2010.

Connacht Cricket Union
Athlone Cricket Club
Ballyhaunis Cricket Club
Ballyhaunis Lions Cricket Club
Ballaghderreen Cricket Club
Claremorris Cricket Club
Castlebar Cricket Club
County Cavan Cricket Club
County Galway Cricket Club
County Sligo Cricket Club
Longford Cricket Club
Riverstown Cricket Club

Munster Cricket Union
Cork County Cricket Club
Cork Harlequins
County Galway Cricket Club
County Kerry Cricket Club
Limerick Cricket Club
Lismore Cricket Club
Midleton Cricket Club
North Kerry Cricket Club
Tipperary County Cricket Club
University College Cork Cricket Club
Waterford District Cricket Club

North West Cricket Union
Senior 1

Bonds Glen
Bready
Brigade
Coleraine
Creevedonnell
Donemana
Fox Lodge
Glendermott
Limavady
Strabane
North Fermanagh

Senior 2
Ardmore
Burndennett
Drummond
Eglinton
Killyclooney
The Nedd
St Johnston
Sion Mills

Northern Cricket Union

Premier League

Ballymena
Carrickfergus
C.I.Y.M.S.
Civil Service North
Instonians
Lisburn
North Down
Waringstown
Euro T20 Slam

Section 1

Bangor
Cliftonville
Derriaghy
Donaghcloney
Downpatrick
Dundrum
Holywood
Lurgan
Muckamore
Woodvale

Section 2

Academy
Armagh
B.I.S.C.
Cooke Collegians
Drumaness
Laurelvale
Millpark
Portadown
Saintfield
Templepatrick

Section 3

Ards
Clogher
Cregagh
Donaghadee
Dungannon
Dunmurry
Larne
P.S.N.I.
Victoria

Leinster Cricket Union

Division 1
Clontarf
Cork County
Malahide
Merrion
North County
Pembroke
Railway Union
YMCA

Division 2
Balbriggan
Dublin University
Leinster
Phoenix
Rush
Terenure (formerly CYM Cricket Club)
The Hills
YMCA II

Other clubs
Adamstown Cricket Club
Ashbourne Cricket Club
Athlone Cricket Club
Avondale Cricket Club
Bagenalstown Cricket Club
Ballaghaderreen Cricket Club
Ballyeighan Cricket Club
Cabinteely Cricket Club
Castleknock Cricket Club
Carlow Cricket Club
Civil Service Cricket Club
Dublin Institute of Technology Cricket Club
Dundrum Cricket Club
Dundalk Cricket Club
Dundalk Institute of Technology Cricket Club
Evening Herald Taverners
Garda Cricket Club
Gorey Cricket Club
Greystones Cricket Club
Halverstown Cricket Club
Knockbrack Cricket Club
Knockharley Cricket Club
Laois Cricket Club
Leprechauns Cricket Club
Letterkenny Cricket Club
Longford Cricket Club
Lucan Cricket Club
Mullingar Cricket Club
Munster Reds Cricket Club
North Kildare Cricket Club
Old Belvedere Cricket Club
Ringcommons Cricket Club
Royal College Of Surgeons Cricket Club
Sandyford Cricket Club
Slieve Bloom Cricket Club
Swords Cricket Club
Tyrellstown Cricket Club
University College Dublin Cricket Club
Wexford Wanderers Cricket Club
Wicklow County Cricket Club

See also
 Munster Cricket Union
 Leinster Cricket Union
 North West of Ireland Cricket Union
 Northern Cricket Union of Ireland

References

 
Clubs